Aimol Chongompipa Reamsochung (born 14 February 2000), commonly known by his nickname Remi, is an Indian footballer who plays as a defender for NEROCA in the I-League.

Club career

NEROCA
In July 2022, Remi signed with I-League club NEROCA. On 18 August, he made his debut for the club in the Imphal Derby against TRAU in the Durand Cup, which ended in a 3–1 win.

Career statistics

Club

References

2000 births
Living people
Footballers from Manipur
Indian footballers
Association football defenders
Chennaiyin FC players
Indian Arrows players
I-League 2nd Division players
I-League players
Indian Super League players
Chennaiyin FC B players
NEROCA FC players